Huang Weijin (born March 23, 1990), also known as Wayne Huang, is a Taiwanese actor, singer, dancer and host. He was a member of the boyband SpeXial from 2012 to 2019, and currently member of another Taiwanese band W0LF(S).

Biography 
Huang was born in Shulin District, New Taipei City on March 3, 1990. He is ethnically part Amis from his mother's side. Huang attended and graduated from Chihlee University of Technology. In 2009, he participated in Taiwanese TV singing contest One Million Star and was placed eighth. He debuted as a singer in 2012 as one of the four founding members of the boyband SpeXial, alongside Wes, Brent and Sam. Later that year, Huang debuted as an actor with a supporting role in the drama PM10-AM03. In the following years, he continued appearing in web series and movies, mostly with his bandmates.

On May 31, 2015, SpeXial won two Hito Music Awards. In 2016, the group became known in the Chinese market by acting in various series and web movies. In August, Huang starred in the popular web series Men with Sword, alongside bandmates Evan, Dylan, Zhiwei, Ian, Simon, and Win. On June 5, SpeXial again won two awards at the 2016 Hito Music Awards.

On March 23, 2018, Huang announced on his personal Facebook account that he was going to enlist in the army in order to fulfill his military service. His first solo concert took place on May 27 of the same year. He enlisted in the army on September 3, 2018 and came back on August 12, 2019. On September 19, 2019 Huang announced that he was going to leave SpeXial.

Filmography

Television

Movies

References

External links 

 Official web site

1990 births
Living people
Taiwanese male television actors
21st-century Taiwanese male actors
21st-century Taiwanese male  singers
Taiwanese pop singers
Taiwanese idols
People from New Taipei
Amis people